An Overseas Service Bar is an insignia worn by United States Army soldiers on the Army Service Uniform, and previously on the Army Green (Class A) and the Army Blue (Dress Blue) uniforms, that indicates the recipient has served six months overseas in a theater of war.

Overseas Service Bars are displayed as an embroidered gold bar worn horizontally on the right sleeve of the Class A uniform and the Army Service Uniform.  Overseas Service Bars are cumulative, in that each bar worn indicates another six-month period.  Time spent overseas is also cumulative, meaning one bar could be earned for two separate deployments totaling six months.

The Overseas Service Bars shown here as ‘Korea’ were used as Overseas Service Bars in World War II.

Background
The original concept of a uniform patch denoting overseas service bar began in the First World War with what was known as an Overseas Chevron. An Overseas Chevron was an inverted chevron patch of golden thread on olive drab backing worn on the lower left sleeve on the standard Army dress uniform, above the service stripes. The chevron was identical to the red Wound Chevron which was worn on the opposite (right) sleeve. Wound Chevrons were replaced by the Purple Heart decoration upon its creation in 1932.

Originally, in 1917, service chevrons came in three colors - 
Silver Chevron Stateside War Service for 6 months.
Gold Chevron Overseas War Service for 6 months. 
Powder Blue Chevron Overseas War Service for less than 6 months.

A soldier's overseas service was calculated from the day they disembarked in Britain or France. Sailors and Marines who served in the European war zone aboard a ship for 6 months (i.e., shipboard service) wore their chevron point-upwards. If they served ashore, they qualified for the Overseas War Service chevron. Overseas service chevrons were discontinued by the Navy and Marine Corps after the First World War.

On 30 June 1944, the War Department issued Circular No. 268, authorizing a bar-shaped uniform patch to symbolize overseas service during World War II. During WWII, it was often informally referred to as a "Hershey bar." The bar was 1/4 inch wide and 1 3/8 inches long, made of golden lace or bullion on an olive drab background, and golden cloth on a khaki background. The background formed a border 1/8 inch wide.  The bar of golden lace or bullion was for wear on the service coat or field jacket, and the bar of golden cloth was for wear on the shirt. Time was computed between the dates of departure from the continental United States and the dates of arrival back to the United States, with the date of departure and date of arrival being counted. Time for the purposes of awarding a bar was calculated either continuously, or at intervals, from 7 December 1941 until "a date 6 months subsequent to the termination of the present war." The Territory of Alaska was considered outside the continental United States for calculating time, but service "on the Great Lakes and in any harbor, bay, or other enclosed arm of the sea along the coast, and that part of the sea which is within 3 miles of the coastline of the United States will not be included in computing length of service required." Time where personnel were deemed absent without leave or in a status amounting to desertion was subtracted from total time earned.

The bar or bars were to be worn centered on the outside of the sleeve of the service coat, field jacket, or shirt, 4 inches from the sleeve opening. If service stripes (each signifying three years of honorable service for enlisted men) were worn on the service coat, the overseas service bars were to be worn immediately above them. For those who had also performed overseas service in the First World War, the overseas service bar and chevron were worn together.

On 2 February 1945, the War Department issued Circular No. 41, which rescinded paragraph 4b of Circular No. 268, 1944, and substituted for paragraph 2 that the background would be made of olive drab felt or "of the same material and color as the garment on which worn" and authorized overseas service bars for wear on the "service coat, winter and summer shirt, field jacket, work clothing, and special suits or jackets." The production of bars made of golden rayon was authorized.

In 1953, the Overseas Service Bar adopted its current name, and the patch was moved to be worn on the lower right sleeve, instead of the left.

Prior to the recent wars in Afghanistan and Iraq, it was rare for an individual to have more than four Overseas Service Bars.  Due to the protracted nature of the recent conflicts with resulting multiple deployments, it is not unusual for senior officers and NCOs to have eight or more Overseas Service Bars.

The Overseas Service Bar is a separate award from the Overseas Service Ribbon, established in 1981, which recognizes overseas service in any location outside of the continental United States (CONUS), without regard as to whether or not the area has been designated a combat zone.  Regulations permit receiving both awards for the same qualifying period of service.

Current regulation
Army Regulation 670–1, Wear and Appearance of Army Uniforms and Insignia, dated 26 January 2021 in Chapter 21, Paragraph 29 states the following:

Notable recipients
 General of the Army Douglas MacArthur was awarded a total of 14 overseas service insignias - 3 gold chevrons for World War I, 9 overseas service bars for World War II and 2 for the Korean War.  He was one of a very few United States service members who was not a prisoner of war to spend the entirety of World War II overseas.
 General George S. Patton was awarded a total of 10 overseas service insignias - 4 chevrons for World War I and 6 for World War II.
 General Jonathan Wainwright IV was awarded a total of 11 overseas service insignias - 4 chevrons for World War I and 7 overseas service bars for World War II.
 General William Westmoreland was awarded a total of 16 overseas service bars - 6 for World War II, 2 for Korea and 8 for Vietnam.
 General Mark J. O'Neil has been awarded 12 overseas service bars.
 Generals Austin S. Miller and Raymond A. Thomas were awarded a total of 13 overseas service bars.
 General Paul LaCamera has received 18 overseas service bars and is still on active duty as of July 2021.
 Colonel Floyd James Thompson, a Green Beret, served a total of 9 years and 3 months in Vietnam with all but 3 months served as a prisoner of war.  He was awarded a total of 18 overseas service bars.

See also
Wound Chevron
Service stripe
Military badges of the United States
Army Service Uniform

External links
 Army Regulation 670-1, dated 26 January 2021

References

Awards and decorations of the United States Army